Maksym Komarets (born 23 May 2002) is a professional Ukrainian football defender who plays for FC Lviv.

Career
Born in Zhovkva Raion, Komarets is a product of the local Rava Rava-Ruska and FC Lviv youth sportive school systems.

He played for FC Lviv in the Ukrainian Premier League Reserves and in July 2020 Komarets was promoted to the senior squad of this team. He made his debut in the Ukrainian Premier League for FC Lviv as a start-squad player on 19 July 2020, playing in a lost home match against FC Mariupol.

References

External links 
Profile at UAF Official Site (Ukr)

2002 births
Living people
People from Rava-Ruska
Ukrainian footballers
FC Lviv players
Ukrainian Premier League players
Association football defenders
Ukraine youth international footballers
Sportspeople from Lviv Oblast